Sanbon New Town refers to a planned city surrounding Sanbon-dong and Geumjeong-dong of Gunpo. In August 1988, the Siheung Mountain Main Site Development Plan was established, and in September 1989, the Housing Site Development Plan was approved. By the time it was completed, 41,000 households were constructed to accommodate 164,000 people, and the development density of the mid-density between the subordinate new town (Sanggye district) and the independent new town (Gwacheon) was planned. A variety of housing types, ranging from small rental houses to private large houses, were supplied so that the population class could form a normal distribution.

New towns in South Korea
Gunpo
New towns started in the 1980s